Morioka Reimen is a local cuisine of Morioka, Iwate Prefecture. It is a cold noodle dish and one of the Three Great Noodles of Morioka, along with Morioka Jajamen and Wanko soba. It is known for its chewy noodles, rich chilled broth, and toppings of Kim Chi. It is based on Naengmyeon from Korea.

Overview
The noodles used in Morioka Reimen are made with potato starch, wheat flour, and white buckwheat flour. They are semi-translucent in appearance and get their chewy texture by being formed by extrusion.  The broth is made from a combination of chicken stock and beef stock. With soy sauce and dried shitake mushrooms added. It is topped with a hard boiled egg, beef shank or chashu pork, cucumber, kimchi, and seasonal fruit such as apple or watermelon

History
The Morioka Style of cold noodle was brought to Japan by Yang Yongcheol (Hanja:楊龍哲). He was born in 1914 in Hamhung, South Hamgyong Province, Korea. At the time it was Korea under Japanese rule and now modern-day North Korea. In March 1938, he came to Japan. In 1940, a new law called Sōshi-kaimei was enacted and he became Teruhito Aoki.

In 1954 Aoki opened a yakiniku restaurant called Shokudoen (食道園) and served cold noodles on the Menu. Using his memory he recreated the taste of his hometown with Japanese ingredients. Slowly the noodles became popular in Morioka. Other restaurants started to open up and also served the cold noodles. By the mid-1980s a gourmet boom elevated the cold noodles to national fame. They started to be known as Morioka Reimen, instead of just Reimen.

Differences from the Korean Naengmyeon

The naengmyeon from Pyongyang are mainly buckwheat flour, but the noodles of Morioka cold noodles are mainly potato starch and have a transparent look. The Pyongyang cold noodles are also thinner and not as strong as Morioka cold noodles.

The naengmyeon from Hamhung can be separated into two types: bibim naengmyeon, served without broth but mixed with chili paste, and mul naengmyeon, served in a clear broth that typically combines beef broth with dongchimi (radish water kimchi). While the broth is different, the strength of Morioka cold noodles is close to that of Hamhung cold noodles but are thicker noodles.

Gallery

References 

Japanese Chinese cuisine
Japanese cuisine